Nathaniel C. Fick (born June 23, 1977) is an American diplomat, technology executive, author, and former United States Marine Corps officer. He was the CEO of cybersecurity software company Endgame, Inc., then worked for Elastic NV after it acquired Endgame. He was an Operating Partner at Bessemer Venture Partners. In 2022, he was selected to lead the U.S. State Department's Bureau for Cyberspace and Digital Policy.

Fick is the author of One Bullet Away: The Making of a Marine Officer, a memoir of his military experience published in 2005 that was a New York Times bestseller, one of the Washington Post's "Best Books of the Year," and one of the Military Times "Best Military Books of the Decade."

Early life and education
Fick was born in Baltimore, Maryland, in 1977, and attended Loyola Blakefield high school in Towson, Maryland. Fick went on to attend Dartmouth College. He later graduated with degrees in classics and government in 1999. While at Dartmouth, Fick captained the cycling team to a U.S. National Championship and wrote a senior thesis on Thucydides' History of the Peloponnesian War and its implications for American foreign policy. After leaving the Marine Corps, Fick earned both an MPA and MBA from Harvard University.

Career
In 1998, after his junior year at Dartmouth, Fick attended the United States Marine Corps Officer Candidates School and was commissioned a second lieutenant upon graduating college the following year.

Fick was trained as an infantry officer and was eventually assigned as a platoon commander to 1st Battalion 1st Marines. He was an officer in the Amphibious Ready Group of the 15th Marine Expeditionary Unit based in Darwin, Northern Territory, training with the Australian Army for humanitarian operations deployment to East Timor until the September 11 attacks. He then led his platoon into Afghanistan for Operation Enduring Freedom to support the War on Terror. Upon his return to the United States in March 2002, he was recommended for Marine reconnaissance training. He also completed Army Airborne School. He subsequently led Second Platoon of Bravo Company of the 1st Reconnaissance Battalion during the invasion of Iraq in 2003.

Fick left the U.S. Marine Corps as a captain in December 2003, and used the GI Bill to attend Harvard Business School and the Harvard Kennedy School. He came to public notice for his writing on military life and the conflicts in Afghanistan and Iraq.  His memoir One Bullet Away won the Colby Award in 2006.

Fick became the chief operating officer (COO) at the Center for a New American Security in 2008 and later was appointed CEO in June 2009.

He was elected to Dartmouth College's board of trustees in April 2012 and served for eight years.

Fick served as the CEO of cybersecurity software company Endgame from 2012 through its acquisition by search company Elastic in 2019, when he became Elastic's general manager of information security. He was recognized in 2018 by Fast Company magazine as one of the "Most Creative People in Business."

He testified before the United States Senate on Iraq and spoke at the 2008 Democratic National Convention in Denver on August 28, 2008, the night Barack Obama accepted the presidential nomination.

He has served on the Military & Veterans Advisory Council at JPMorgan Chase & Co.

Ambassador at-large

On June 3, 2022, Fick was nominated as the U.S. State Department’s first Ambassador-at-Large for Cyberspace and Digital Policy. Hearings on his nomination were held before the Senate Foreign Relations Committee on August 3, 2022.

The Senate confirmed Fick's nomination on September 15 by unanimous voice vote, and he was sworn in on September 21.

On February 4, 2023, Fick announced that his personal Twitter account had been hacked. He called the incident one of the "perils of the job". It was unclear who hacked the account or if any unauthorized tweets were being sent from the account.

Personal life
He resides in Maine with his wife, Margaret Angell, and two daughters.

In popular culture
Fick and his platoon were the subjects of a series of articles in Rolling Stone and the book Generation Kill by the embedded journalist Evan Wright. The articles won the National Magazine Award in 2003. Generation Kill was adapted by David Simon and Ed Burns into a miniseries of the same name for HBO, in which Fick was portrayed by Stark Sands.

See also

 List of United States Marines
 Members of the Council on Foreign Relations

References

External links

 

Living people
1977 births
United States Marine Corps personnel of the Iraq War
American military writers
Dartmouth College alumni
Harvard Business School alumni
Harvard Kennedy School alumni
United States Marine Corps officers
Businesspeople from Baltimore
People from Towson, Maryland
Henry Crown Fellows
Loyola Blakefield alumni
United States Ambassadors-at-Large
Biden administration personnel